Sweden has participated in the Eurovision Young Dancers 15 times since its debut in 1985. Sweden has hosted the contest once, in 1993 and jointly won the contest in 2003. Sweden is also the only country that has participated in every edition.

Participation overview

Hostings

See also
Sweden in the Eurovision Song Contest
Sweden in the Eurovision Dance Contest
Sweden in the Eurovision Young Musicians
Sweden in the Junior Eurovision Song Contest

External links 
 Eurovision Young Dancers

Countries in the Eurovision Young Dancers